Ken Bastida (born December 30, 1956) is a former broadcast journalist who most recently anchored at KPIX-TV, the CBS station in San Francisco.

Bastida holds a bachelor's degree in Broadcast Communication Arts from San Francisco State University and was inducted into the university's Hall of Fame in May 2008. Bastida began his career as a Bay Area radio host in 1978. Since then, he held on-air positions at numerous Bay Area radio stations, including KFRC, KGO, KMEL, K101, KFYI and KCBS. For a time, Bastida hosted Landscape Smart, a landscaping show on HGTV.

He joined KPIX as a reporter in 1990 and retired from television news after his final broadcast at the station on October 29, 2021.

Awards

Public and industry awards
1989 Peabody Award for coverage of the Loma Prieta earthquake
2004 Emmy Award for outstanding achievement in continuing coverage for his series "Inside the Middle East"
2007 Emmy Award for Best Newscast Large Market

References

1956 births
Living people
People from South San Francisco, California
Television anchors from San Francisco
San Francisco State University alumni